Jim Jacobs, commonly known by his nickname, "Jake', is an American Hot rodder and customizer.

Jacobs built a yellow 1933 Ford 3-window coupé featured on the cover of Custom Rod in November 1973, along with a similar '34 built by Pete Chapouris.

The coincidence would lead them to form a partnership, Pete and Jake's Hot Rod Shop in Temple City, California, in 1974.

Notes 

Kustom Kulture artists
American automobile designers
Vehicle modification people
Businesspeople from California
20th-century American businesspeople
21st-century American businesspeople
Living people
Year of birth missing (living people)